The Adventurous Soul is a 1927 American silent drama film directed by Gene Carroll and starring Mildred Harris, Tom Santschi and Charles K. French.

Synopsis
The owner of a shipping line arranges to have his waster son shanghaied on one of his vessels commanded by the tough Captain Svenson. But the son discovers in time and gives them the slip. Instead a clerk working for the company Dick Marlow, engaged to his sister Miriam, is taken instead.

Cast
 Mildred Harris as 	Miriam Martin
 Jimmy Fulton as Dick Barlow
 Tom Santschi as 	Captain Svenson
 Arthur Rankin as Glenn Martin
 Charles K. French as 	John Martin

References

Bibliography
 Connelly, Robert B. The Silents: Silent Feature Films, 1910-36, Volume 40, Issue 2. December Press, 1998.
 Munden, Kenneth White. The American Film Institute Catalog of Motion Pictures Produced in the United States, Part 1. University of California Press, 1997.

External links
 

1927 films
1927 drama films
1920s English-language films
American silent feature films
Silent American drama films
American black-and-white films
1920s American films